Cidaroida is an order of primitive sea urchins, the only living order of the subclass Perischoechinoidea. All other orders of this subclass, which were even more primitive than the living forms, became extinct during the Mesozoic.

Description
Their primary spines are much more widely separated than in other sea urchins, and they have no buccal slits. Other primitive features include relatively simple plates in the test, and the ambulacral plates continuing as a series across the membrane that surrounds the mouth.

Families

According to World Register of Marine Species: 
 family Anisocidaridae Vadet, 1999 †
 super-family Cidaridea Gray, 1825
 family Cidaridae Gray, 1825
 family Ctenocidaridae Mortensen, 1928a
 family Paurocidaridae Vadet, 1999a †
 family Diplocidaridae Gregory, 1900 †
 family Heterocidaridae Mortensen, 1934 †
 super-family Histocidaroidea Lambert, 1900
 family Histocidaridae Lambert, 1900
 family Psychocidaridae Ikeda, 1936
 family Miocidaridae Durham & Melville, 1957 †
 family Polycidaridae Vadet, 1988 †
 family Rhabdocidaridae Lambert, 1900 †
 family Serpianotiaridae Hagdorn, 1995 †
 family Triadocidaridae Smith, 1994c †

References

Citations

Sources
 
 
 

 
Cisuralian first appearances
Extant Permian first appearances